Calophyllum chapelieri is a species of flowering plant in the Calophyllaceae family. It is found only in Madagascar, where it lives in the island's eastern lowland rainforests.

Description
Calophyllum chapelieri is a tree which grows from 4 to 25 meters high. It flowers from October to February, and fruits from October to June.

Range and habitat
Calophyllum chapelieri is native to eastern Madagascar, ranging along the eastern coastal lowlands from Masoala to Manakara, in Atsinanana, Analanjorofo and Vatovavy Fitovinany regions (former provinces of  Fianarantsoa and Toamasina). It inhabits moist lowland forest from 10 to 557 meters elevation.

It is known from 13 locations, with an estimated extent of occurrence (EOO) of 11,326 km2, and a minimum area of occupancy (AOO) of 104 km2.

The tree is threatened with habitat loss from shifting cultivation, deforestation for timber harvesting and agriculture, and urbanization. The species' conservation status is assessed as near threatened.

References

Endemic flora of Madagascar
Vulnerable plants
chapelieri
Taxonomy articles created by Polbot
Flora of the Madagascar lowland forests